The 2014 EuroHockey Club Champions Cup is the 42nd edition of the premier European competition for women's field hockey clubs. It will be played in 's-Hertogenbosch, Netherlands between 18 April and 21 April 2014.
There will not be a round-robin. The eight teams will be placed in the bracket starting from the quarter-finals. Winning teams will advance to the semi-finals and losing teams will play placement matches.
Host team HC Den Bosch was the defending champion. Dutch teams dominated the tournament. In the final Amsterdam H&BC met the hosts. Normal time ended 2 – 2 and the winner was decided in a shoot-out. Amsterdam H&BC won 3 – 0. Uhlenhorster HC took third place by defeating Real Sociedad in the bronze match 1 – 1 (4 – 2)p.

Champions Cup

Quarter-finals

Fifth to eighth place classification

Crossover

Seventh and eighth place

Fifth and sixth place

First to fourth place classification

Semi-finals

Third place

Final

Statistics

Final ranking
 Amsterdam H&CB
 HC Den Bosch
 Uhlenhorster HC
 Real Sociedad
 Reading HC
 Berliner HC
 Railway Union HC
 Atasport

Awards
Individual player awards:
Player of the Tournament: Lidewij Welten  HC Den Bosch
Top goalscorer: Eva de Goede  Amsterdam H&CB
Goalkeeper of the Tournament: Yvonne Frank  Uhlenhorster HC

Top goalscorers

References

External links
 

2014
2014 in women's field hockey
2014 in Dutch women's sport
2014 EuroHockey Club Champions Cup (women)
April 2014 sports events in Europe
2013–14 in European field hockey